Dennis Ronald MacDonald (born 1946) is the John Wesley Professor of New Testament and Christian Origins at the Claremont School of Theology in California.  MacDonald proposes a theory wherein the earliest books of the New Testament were responses to the Homeric Epics, including the Gospel of Mark and the Acts of the Apostles.  The methodology he pioneered is called Mimesis Criticism.  If his theories are correct then "nearly everything written on [the] early Christian narrative is flawed."  According to him, modern biblical scholarship has failed to recognize the impact of Homeric Poetry.

The other major branch of MacDonald's scholarly activity is his contribution to the Synoptic Problem. He calls his solution the Q+/Papias Hypothesis.

Background
MacDonald earned his undergraduate degree from Bob Jones University, a Master of Divinity from McCormick Theological Seminary, and a Ph.D from Harvard University.  He taught Theology and Biblical Studies at the Iliff School of Theology in Denver, Colorado from 1980 to 1998.  Since 1998 to present he has been the John Wesley Professor of New Testament at the Claremont School of Theology and Professor of Religion at the Claremont Graduate University.  He also is the director of the Institute for Antiquity and Christianity at Claremont.

Christianizing Homer
In one of MacDonald's first books, Christianizing Homer: The Odyssey, Plato, and the Acts of Andrew, he posited the theory that the non-canonical Acts of Andrew was a Christian retelling of Homer's Iliad.  In it he argued that one could detect trends that showed parallels between the Homeric epic and the Acts of Andrew.  He argued that the Acts of Andrew is better understood in light of the Odyssey.  That the order of events in the Acts follows those found in the Acts of Andrew, that certain events in the Acts are better understood when understood in context of the Homeric epics, and that the Homeric texts commonly were available during the first century AD. In subsequent works, MacDonald expanded his hypothesis to include the Acts of the Apostles and the Gospel of Mark as being Christian variations of the Homeric epics.

In Christianizing Homer, MacDonald lays down his principles of literary mimesis, his methodology for comparing ancient texts.  There are six aspects he examines 1) accessibility, 2) analogy, 3) density, 4) order, 5) distinctive traits, and 6) interpretability.  According to his hypothesis, not only was Homer readily available to the authors of the New Testament, but the Homeric epics would have been the basic texts upon which the New Testament authors learned to write Greek.  MacDonald also argues that the number of common traits, the order in which they occur, and the distinctiveness thereof between the Homeric Texts and early Christian documents help to show that the New Testament writers were using Homeric models when writing various books.  

In his earliest reviews, MacDonald only applied his hypothesis to works such as Tobit and the Acts of Peter.  In later works, he posits the Acts of the Apostles, the Gospel of Mark, and Gospel of Luke merged two cultural classics of his time period in order to "depict Jesus as more compassionate, powerful, noble, and inured to suffering than Odysseus."

Homeric epics and the Gospel of Mark
MacDonald's most famous work, however, is The Homeric Epics and the Gospel of Mark.  According to MacDonald, the Gospel of Mark is "a deliberate and conscious anti-epic, an inversion of the Greek 'Bible' of Homer's Iliad and Odyssey, which in a sense updates and Judaizes the outdated heroic values presented by Homer, in the figure of a new hero."  

The book begins by examining the role that the Homeric Epics played in antiquity—namely that anybody who was considered educated at the time learned to read and write, and they did so by studying the Odyssey and Iliad.  Students were expected, not only to understand the epics, but be able to rewrite the stories in their own words.  Rewriting the Homeric Epics was commonplace and accepted in biblical times.

In using the Homeric Epics, the ancient writers were not trying to deceive their readers; in fact MacDonald believes the ancient readers understood the juxtapositions of Jesus with Odysseus.  “Mark’s purpose”, he argues, “in creating so many stories about Jesus was to demonstrate how superior [Jesus] was to Greek heroes.  Few readers of Mark fail to see how he portrays Jesus as superior to Jewish worthies… He does the same for Greek heroes.”

MacDonald's thesis has not found acceptance and has received strong criticism by other scholars. Karl Olav Sandnes notes the vague nature of alleged parallels as the "Achilles' heel" of the "slippery" project. He has also questioned the nature of the alleged paralleled motifs, seeing MacDonald's interpretations of common motives. He states, "His [MacDonald's] reading is fascinating and contributes to a reader-orientated exegesis. But he fails to demonstrate authorial intention while he, in fact, neglects the OT intertextuality that is broadcast in this literature." 

Daniel Gullotta from Stanford similarly writes "MacDonald’s list of unconvincing comparisons goes on and has been noted by numerous critics. Despite MacDonald’s worthy call for scholars to reexamine the educational practices of the ancient world, all of the evidence renders his position of Homeric influential dominance untenable." 

Adam Winn, though adopting MacDonald's methods of mimetic criticism, concluded after a detailed analysis of MacDonald's theses and comparisons between Homer and Mark that "MacDonald is unable to provide a single example of clear and obvious Markan interpretation of Homer... because MacDonald's evidence is at best suggestive, it will ultimately convince few." 

Kristian Larsson discusses the concept of intertextual density and its application in what MacDonald views as one of the most convincing cases of Markan imitation, namely the Cyclops – Circe complex in Odyssey 9-10 and the Gerasene demoniac story in Mark 5.

David Litwa argues that problematic parts of MacDonald's thesis include that he construes both large ranges of similarity in addition to large range of difference as evidence for parallel, that he alters his parallels in order to make them more convincing like suggesting that Jesus walking on water is comparable to Athena and Hermes flying above water, that he has an inconsistent application of his own six criteria (where he often uses only one or two to establish parallel and thus relies largely on loose structural standards of similarity), and that he often has completely unconvincing parallels such as his comparison of Odysseus on a floating island to Jesus sitting in a boat that floats on water.

Selected works

Book

Edited by

Chapters

See also
Mimesis Criticism
Q+/Papias Hypothesis

References

Further reading
 Karl Olav Sandnes, "Imitatio Homeri? An Appraisal of Dennis R. MacDonald's "Mimesis Criticism"", Journal of Biblical Literature 1124/4 (2005) 715–732.
 Stan Harstine, review of Dennis R. Macdonald, Does the New Testament Imitate Homer?: Four Cases from the Acts of the Apostles, Review of Biblical Literature (2005).

External links

American Christian theologians
New Testament scholars
American biblical scholars
1946 births
Living people
Bob Jones University alumni
Harvard Divinity School alumni
McCormick Theological Seminary alumni
Members of the Jesus Seminar